Masset , formerly Massett, is a village in Haida Gwaii in British Columbia, Canada. It is the primary western terminus of Trans-Canada Highway 16 (the Yellowhead Highway) and is served by Masset Airport, with flights to Vancouver and Prince Rupert. During the maritime fur trade of the early 19th century, Masset was a key trading site. It was incorporated as a village municipality on May 11, 1961.

Name 
The name Masset was a gift from the captain of a Spanish vessel that was repaired with the assistance of the Haida citizens of Atewaas, Kayung and Jaaguhl. These three villages accepted the gift and adopted the name Masset to commemorate what might be the first ever contact between Europeans and the Haida.

During the early years of Canadian colonization the name Masset and the post office were adopted by the former Reverend Charles Harrison as part of his scheme to sell land.

The name Masset is currently in use by the Village of Masset, a municipality under Canada legislation and the Village of Old Massett, the original recipient of the name and a village under the Constitution of the Haida Nation.

According to John T. Walbran, Masset came from the Haida word Masst, or large island. Captain Douglas, on his second visit from Nootka Sound aboard the Iphigenia on June 19, 1789, named the bay leading to the inlet McIntyre's Bay. This name was used on the charts of Dixon and Meares. The American traders called the inlet, Hancock's River as shown in Ingraham's chart of 1792 after the American brig Hancock. A survey was made in 1907 by Captain Learmouth on HMS Egeria.

Masset's name in the local dialect of the Haida language is Uttewas, "white slope", probably referring to a small hill south of the village.

Demographics 

Oceanographic research
From 1942 to 1942, the British Columbia Shore Station Oceanographic Program was collecting coastal water temperature and salinity measurements for the Department of Fisheries and Oceans from Masset everyday during this period.

Military base 

Canadian Forces Station Leitrim Detachment Masset, established as Naval Radio Station Masset in 1943, is a Canadian Forces facility used to gather signals intelligence for the Communications Security Establishment Canada and the Canadian Forces Intelligence Branch. The equipment at CFS Masset is operated remotely from CFS Leitrim near Ottawa, Ontario.

Notable people from Masset 
 Guujaaw (wood carver, musician, traditional medicine practitioner and political activist)
 Michael Nicoll Yahgulanaas (Haida manga artist)
 Robert Davidson (artist)
 Florence Davidson (artist)
 Reg Davidson (carver)

Climate 
The climate, moderated by a warm Pacific current from Japan, is generally mild with no extremes in temperature, oceanic (Cfb). Annual temperature varies only 20 degrees Celsius but is variable and unpredictable - even within a 24-hour period.

Summer temperatures are in the  range and the days are long - May, June, July boasting 18 hours of daylight. August and May general have the most sun but there is a fair degree of rain throughout the summer months. Winter months are mild with temperatures in the  range and while precipitation is usually in the form of rain there can be some snowfall.

Although it is located at over 54 degrees north, rainfall follows a Mediterranean pattern. It is one of the northernmost places with this characteristic.

See also

Masset Formation
List of Haida villages

References

External links 

Villages in British Columbia
Populated places in Haida Gwaii
Haida villages
Graham Island
Hudson's Bay Company trading posts